This article shows the rosters of the participating teams at the 1990 FIVB Volleyball Men's World Championship in Brazil from 18–28 October 1990.

Head coach: Julio Velasco

Head coach: Orlando Samuels

Head coach: Viacheslav Platanov

Head coach: Paulo De Freitas ("Bebeto")

Head coach: Ivan Seferinov

Head coach: Luis Fernando Muchaga

Head coach: Henry Brokking

Head coach: Gerard Castan

Head coach: Rudolf Matejka, Zdenek Pommer

Head coach: Anders Kristiansson

Head coach: Masayuki Minami

Head coach: Brian Watson

Head coach: Bill Neville Bill (Jim Coleman?)

Head coach: Jin Jeun-Talk

Head coach: Vassili Netchai

Head coach: Marcelo Arias

References

External links
Results and teams

1990 in volleyball
FIVB Volleyball Men's World Championship squads